The Western Athletic Conference football championship game was a short-lived annual postseason college football game played to determine the champion of the Western Athletic Conference (MW).

History
The Western Athletic Conference staged a conference title football game during the three years (1996–1998) the league consisted of sixteen members. During this time, the league was split into two divisions, Pacific and Mountain, with eight teams in each division. The top finisher in each division played for the championship, which was held at Sam Boyd Stadium in the Las Vegas Valley. When conference membership was cut in half in 1999 with the formation of the Mountain West Conference, both the championship game and two-division format were discontinued. All participants in the three title games were among the defections to Mountain West.

Results

Results by year
Below are the results from all WAC Football Championship Games played. The winning team appears in bold font, on a background of their primary team color. Rankings are from the AP Poll released prior to the game.

Results by team

See also
 List of NCAA Division I FBS conference championship games

References

 
Recurring sporting events established in 1996
1996 establishments in the United States
Recurring sporting events disestablished in 1998
1998 disestablishments in the United States